Izetta Roberts Cooper (born 1929) is a Liberian librarian and writer.

Life
Izetta Roberts was born on October 13, 1929. Her father, the Liberian Senator Isaac Roberts, had died earlier that year. She attended St Teresa Convent elementary school, followed by high school at the College of West Africa, where she graduated with a Diploma in 1948. She proceeded to Boston University, graduating with a B.Sc. in education in 1954. She married the doctor Henry Nehemiah Cooper on 11 July 1953.  She then completed an M.S. in library science from Case Western Reserve University in 1955.

After completing library training, Cooper worked in the library of Fisk University, before returning to Liberia to become Librarian at the University of Liberia. She also served as consultant for President William Tubman's Presidential Library. From 1978 to 1980 she hosted and produced a Liberian TV show called The World of Books.

After Cooper met the African-American quilting expert Kyra E. Hicks in the Washington, D.C., area in 2008, the pair collaborated on Liberia: a visit through books, a bibliography of Liberia combined with Cooper's autobiographical reminiscences.

Works
 Cooper, Izetta R, and Kyra E. Hicks. Liberia: A Visit Through Books; a Selected Annotated Bibliography & Reflections of a Liberian Librarian. 2008. 
 Cooper, Henry N, Izetta R. Cooper, Dawn C. Barnes. The Return of the Guinea Fowl: An Autobiographical Novel of a Liberian Doctor. 2011.

References

Living people
College of West Africa alumni
Boston University alumni
University of Liberia people
Case Western Reserve University alumni
Librarians
Women librarians
1929 births